Jerry Yakel is an American neuroscientist currently at National Institutes of Health and an Elected Fellow of the American Association for the Advancement of Science.

References

Fellows of the American Association for the Advancement of Science
American neuroscientists
Oregon State University alumni
University of California, Los Angeles alumni
Year of birth missing (living people)
Living people